The overlap coefficient, or Szymkiewicz–Simpson coefficient, is a similarity measure that measures the overlap between two finite sets. It is related to the Jaccard index and is defined as the size of the intersection divided by the smaller of the size of the two sets:

If set X is a subset of Y or the converse then the overlap coefficient is equal to 1.

References

Information retrieval techniques
Information retrieval evaluation
Measure theory
Similarity measures